Ayisha Davies is an Australian film producer. She is most famous for producing such films as Coffin Rock (2009) and The Bloody Sweet Hit (2007). Davies has been working within the Australian film industry for eight years and is currently working for Ultra Films. In addition, Davies previously worked in the realm of television, as a production secretary.

Personal life 

On 12 July 2017, Davies married Australian actor Robert Taylor; together, they have a daughter named Scarlet

Career 1999- present 

Davies began her career in 1999 as a production secretary for Australian television series Halifax f.p. This early phase in her career was quite short-lived as her time as production secretary lasted only two episodes, which include A Murder of Crows (15 August 1999) and Someone You Know (27 June 1999).  Davies then went on to become a literary manager where she represented some of the most talented people within the Australian film industry including David Lightfoot and the filmmakers of SAW.  In 2007 Davies became the production manager and producer of Damian Walshe-Howling’s short film The Bloody Sweet Hit  where her career as a producer began to take off, as her film was selected to play at " The St Kilda International Film Festival, Miami Film Festival, Shorts Film Festival, London's Rushes Soho, Flickerfest, Movie Extra and most recently sold to MTV Italy."   It was because of husband Robert Taylor that Davies was introduced to Lightfoot as Taylor had worked with him previously in the 2005 film Wolf Creek. It was because of this introduction that in 2007, Davies then began working alongside Lightfoot at Ultra films.  Davies first role alongside Lightfoot was as his assistant and 2nd production manager to the film Rogue (2007). Davies was then appointed as a producer for the film Coffin Rock (2009), co produced short film Press (2010), and worked as a production manager on the film John Doe: Vigilante (2014). In 2014, Davies was working on producing two films, the first, What Lola Wants, starring husband Robert Taylor,  and the second, Skylab, a thriller set in outer space. What Lola Wants was released in 2015 and on DVD in April 2016.

Filmography

Television

References

Australian film producers
Living people
Year of birth missing (living people)